Commonwealth College may refer to the following American schools:

 Commonwealth College (Arkansas)
 The Commonwealth Medical College in Pennsylvania
 Commonwealth Honors College, at the University of Massachusetts Amherst

See also 
 Commonwealth (disambiguation)